

Canadian Football News in 1898

Regular season

Final regular season standings
Note: GP = Games Played, W = Wins, L = Losses, T = Ties, PF = Points For, PA = Points Against, Pts = Points

Bold text means that they have clinched the playoffs

League Champions

Playoffs

Dominion Quarter Final

Dominion Semi-Final 1

Dominion Semi-Final 2

Dominion Championship

References

 
Canadian Football League seasons